"The Only Way Out" is a 2014 song by British rock band Bush, released on 9 September 2014, through Zuma Rock Records. Produced by Jay Baumgardner and recorded at NRG Recording Studios in North Hollywood, California, it was the lead single from their sixth album Man on the Run. According to songwriter Gavin Rossdale, the song is "a good gateway into the record ... it gets a bit wider and probably a little darker. This is just the right way in."

Release
"The Only Way Out" was released on 9 September 2014, through Zuma Rock Records.

On 1 October 2014, the music video for "The Only Way Out" premiered on Vevo.

Artwork
Tobias Hutzler is credited with the artwork for "The Only Way Out".

Chart performance

References

Bush (British band) songs
2014 songs
2014 singles
Songs written by Gavin Rossdale